Ovide may refer to:

 Ovide, a brand name for the insecticide malathion
 Ovide, a character in the animated television show Ovide and the Gang

People
 Ovide Alakannuark, Canadian politician
 Ovide Le Blanc, Canadian politician
 Ovide Lamontagne, American lawyer and politician
 Ovide Mercredi, Canadian politician
 Ovide de Montigny, French-Canadian fur trapper
 Joseph-Ovide Turgeon, Canadian politician

See also
 Ovid